Avie is a female or male given name. As a nickname, it can be short for Avis, Avery, Avanel, and Ava. People named Avie include:
 
 Avie Bennett, a Canadian businessman
 Avie Bridges, Dean of the Kinesiology Division at Santa Ana College
 Avie Tevanian, ex–Chief Software Technology Officer at Apple Computer
 Avie Luthra, a British playwright and screenwriter
 Avie Lee Parton, Dolly Parton’s mother
 Avie Makis, a Uganda Musician, singer songwriter

References

Feminine given names
Masculine given names
English-language unisex given names
Hypocorisms